Róbert Kociš (born 27 December 1973) is a retired Slovak football striker.

After his career he began to work in Nováky Power Plant. He is father of two sons Adrián and Tomáš. He also manages amateur football sides in Prievidza District and surrunding regions, as he holds UEFA B licence.

References

1973 births
Living people
Slovak footballers
1. FC Tatran Prešov players
Fortuna Düsseldorf players
FK Austria Wien players
FC Carl Zeiss Jena players
AC Omonia players
Anagennisi Deryneia FC players
FC Baník Prievidza players
FC Gossau players
Bundesliga players
2. Bundesliga players
Austrian Football Bundesliga players
Association football forwards
Slovak expatriate footballers
Expatriate footballers in Austria
Slovak expatriate sportspeople in Austria
Expatriate footballers in Germany
Slovak expatriate sportspeople in Germany
Expatriate footballers in Cyprus
Slovak expatriate sportspeople in Cyprus
Sportspeople from Trebišov